Kevin D. Saunders is an American video game designer and producer, best known for his roles in developing Neverwinter Nights 2: Mask of the Betrayer (Producer and Lead Designer), Neverwinter Nights 2: Storm of Zehir (Producer), and Torment: Tides of Numenera (Project Director).

Career 
Saunders graduated with a Masters of Engineering from Cornell University, and began his career at Nexon, as director and lead designer on Nexus: The Kingdom of the Winds and Shattered Galaxy, which won multiple awards at the 2001 Independent Games Festival. He went on to work as a designer at Westwood Studios (on Command & Conquer Generals: Zero Hour and Lord of the Rings: The Battle for Middle-Earth), before becoming a senior designer and producer at Obsidian Entertainment (on Star Wars: Knights of the Old Republic II – The Sith Lords, Mask of the Betrayer, Storm of Zehir, Aliens: Crucible, and Dungeon Siege III).  He next joined inXile Entertainment, where he served in a production role on Wasteland 2 before helping Torment: Tides of Numenera become, at the time, the most successful Kickstarter ever.  He served as project director on Torment before turning to Nexon, where he served as Head of Studio on the company's Nebula project.  His last game work was for Arcanity, providing story, design, and production assistance on Tanzia.

In addition to this work, Saunders served as Creative Director at Alelo, where he led the development of an award-winning language-learning RPG.  Saunders also authored a college text on game interface design (Game Development Essentials: Game Interface Design).

References

External links

American video game designers
American video game producers
Cornell University College of Engineering alumni
Dungeons & Dragons video game designers
Living people
Obsidian Entertainment people
Year of birth missing (living people)